Charles Joseph Chaput  (born September 26, 1944) is an American prelate of the Roman Catholic Church. He was the ninth archbishop of the Archdiocese of Philadelphia in Pennsylvania, serving from 2011 until 2020. He previously served as archbishop of the Archdiocese of Denver  in Colorado (1997–2011) and bishop of the Diocese of Rapid City in South Dakota (1988–1997). Chaput was the first archbishop of Philadelphia in 100 years who was not named a cardinal.

Chaput is a professed Capuchin Franciscan. A member of the Prairie Band Potawatomi Nation in Kansas, he is the second Native American bishop and the first Native American archbishop.

Early life
Charles Chaput was born on September 26, 1944, in Concordia, Kansas, one of three children of Joseph and Marian Helen (née DeMarais) Chaput. His father was a French Canadian who was descended from King Louis IX. His mother was a Native American of the Prairie Band Potawatomi tribe; his maternal grandmother was the last member of the family to live on a reservation. Chaput himself was enrolled in the tribe at a young age, taking the name Pietasa ("rustling wind"). His Potawatomi name is "the wind that rustles the leaves of the tree" while his Sioux name is "good eagle".

Chaput received his early education at Our Lady of Perpetual Help Grade School in Concordia. Deciding to become a priest at the age of 13, he attended St. Francis Seminary High School in Victoria, Kansas.

In 1965, at age 21, Chaput entered the Order of Friars Minor Capuchin, a branch of the Franciscans, in Pittsburgh, Pennsylvania. In 1967, he graduated with a bachelor's degree in philosophy from St. Fidelis College Seminary in Herman, Pennsylvania. On July 14, 1968, he made his solemn profession as a Capuchin friar. In 1970, he earned a Master of Arts in religious education from Capuchin College in Washington, DC.

Priesthood
Chaput was ordained to the priesthood for the Capuchin Order by Bishop Cyril Vogel on August 29, 1970. He received a Master of Theology degree from the University of San Francisco in 1971. From 1971 to 1974, he was an instructor in theology and spiritual director at St. Fidelis College. He then served as executive secretary and director of communications for the Capuchin province in Pittsburgh until 1977. As a seminarian, Chaput was an active volunteer in the 1968 presidential campaign of Senator Robert F. Kennedy. As a young priest, he supported the election of Jimmy Carter as US president in 1976.  Chaput was appointed pastor of Holy Cross Parish in Thornton, Colorado.

Chaput was elected vicar provincial for the Capuchin Province of Mid-America in 1977 and became secretary and treasurer for the province in 1980 and chief executive and provincial minister in 1983. He was among a group of Native Americans who greeted Pope John Paul II when he visited Phoenix, Arizona, in 1987.

Episcopal career

Bishop of Rapid City
On April 11, 1988, Chaput was appointed bishop of the Diocese of Rapid City by John Paul II. He was consecrated on July 26, 1988, by Archbishop Pio Laghi, with Archbishop John Roach and Archbishop James Stafford serving as co-consecrators. He was the second priest of Native American ancestry to be consecrated a bishop in the United States, after Donald Pelotte. He was the first Native American to be consecrated as an ordinary bishop rather than a titular bishop. He chose as his episcopal motto: "As Christ Loved the Church" from Ephesians 5:25.

Archbishop of Denver
On February 18, 1997, Chaput was appointed by John Paul II as archbishop of the Archdiocese of Denver, replacing Archbishop James Stafford. In 2007, Chaput delivered the commencement address at Denver's Augustine Institute, a lay-run graduate school that he has actively supported. Since 2008, he has served as episcopal moderator of the Tekakwitha Conference.

In 2007, Chaput conducted an apostolic visitation to the Diocese of Toowoomba, in Queensland, Australia, on behalf of the Congregation for Bishops. The Vatican was concerned by statements made by Bishop Bill Morris asking the church to discuss the ordination of women.  At the conclusion of the visitation Chaput told a senior priest of the diocese that he thought Bishop  Morris had nothing to worry about. In May 2011, Bishop Morris was removed from his diocesan leadership role, having refused invitations from the Vatican to resign. He remains a retired Bishop in good standing with the Vatican and well regarded by the people and clergy of Toowoomba Diocese.  

Chaput was one of five bishops who conducted a Vatican-ordered investigation into the Legionaries of Christ in 2009 to 2010, following sexual abuse accusations levied against the group's founder, Marcial Maciel.

Archbishop of Philadelphia
On July 19, 2011, Chaput was appointed as archbishop of the Archdiocese of Philadelphia by Pope Benedict XVI. He succeeded Cardinal Justin Rigali, who had reached retirement age of 75 in April 2010. Chaput's strong record in handling cases of sexual abuse by priests was cited as a rationale for his appointment. He was installed on September 8, 2011.

From August 17 to 19, 2011, Chaput gave catechesis at the World Youth Day 2011 in Madrid, Spain, similar to the function he performed at the 2008 World Youth Day in Sydney. On November 14, 2014, at a meeting of the United States Conference of Catholic Bishops (USCCB),  Chaput was elected as a delegate to the 2015 Synod of Bishops on the Family pending Vatican approval. Though Chaput led a historically important see and his five immediate predecessors were cardinals, Benedict XVI did not appoint him a cardinal in his two 2012 consistories, nor did Pope Francis in any of his.

Pope Francis accepted Chaput's letter of resignation as archbishop of the Archdiocese of Philadelphia  on January 23, 2020.

Views

Politics
In his book Render unto Caesar: Serving the Nation by Living Our Catholic Beliefs in Political Life, Chaput exhorts Catholics to take a "more active, vocal, and morally consistent role" in the political process, arguing that private convictions cannot be separated from public actions without diminishing both. Rather than asking citizens to put aside their religious and moral beliefs for the sake of public policy, Chaput believes American democracy depends upon a fully engaged citizenry, including religious believers, to function properly.

Abortion 
Chaput has stated that absolute loyalty to the Church's teachings on core, bioethical, and natural law doctrinal issues must be a higher priority for Catholics than their identity as Americans, their party affiliation and agenda and the laws of their country; Chaput also argues that for a Catholic, loyalty to God is more important than any other identity. He says that the martyrs and confessors gave witness to this importance.

Regarding whether Catholic politicians who support abortion rights for women should be denied communion, Chaput has written that, while denying anyone the Eucharist is a "very grave matter" that should be used only in "extraordinary cases of public scandal", those who are "living in serious sin or who deny the teachings of the Church" should voluntarily refrain from receiving communion.

The New York Times in 2004 reported that Chaput said it was sinful for Catholics to vote for Democratic presidential nominee Senator John Kerry. He noted Kerry's views on abortion rights, among others. According to the Times, Chaput said that anyone voting for Kerry was "cooperating in evil" and needed "to go to confession". After the interview, Chaput criticized The New York Times for the way it construed his remarks.  The archdiocese criticized the article as being "heavily truncated and framed" and posted a full transcript of it. He stopped responding to the paper's inquiries for six years, in part because he believed the Times had misrepresented him. Chaput was seen by some critics as "part of a group of bishops intent on throwing the weight of the Church into the elections". In public comments, his linkage of the Eucharist to the policy stances of political candidates and their supporters were seen as a politicization of moral theology.

In 2009, Chaput criticized a "spirit of adulation bordering on servility" toward President Barack Obama, remarking that "in democracies, we elect public servants, not messiahs". He said that Obama tried to mask his record on abortion rights and other issues with "rosy marketing about unity, hope, and change". Chaput also dismissed the notion that Obama was given a broad mandate, saying that he was elected to "fix an economic crisis" and not to "retool American culture on the issues of marriage and the family, sexuality, bioethics, religion in public life, and abortion".

Chaput said that the 2016 American presidential election offered Americans the "worst choice in 50 years".  In his view, both Donald Trump and former Secretary of State Hillary Clinton were "deeply flawed" candidates.

Gun control 
Following the 2019 mass shootings in El Paso, Texas, and Dayton, Ohio, Chaput wrote that he supports background checks for purchasers of firearms, but added this comment:"Only a fool can believe that 'gun control' will solve the problem of mass violence. The people using the guns in these loathsome incidents are moral agents with twisted hearts. And the twisting is done by the culture of sexual anarchy, personal excess, political hatreds, intellectual dishonesty, and perverted freedoms that we've systematically created over the past half-century".

LGBT rights 
Chaput opposes same-sex marriage and questioned the upbringing of children of same-sex couples. He has said that same-sex couples cannot show children that their parents love each other in the same way that opposite-sex couples can.

In 2015, Chaput supported the dismissal of Margie Winters, the director of religious education at Waldron Mercy Academy in Merion Station, Pennsylvania.  Winters had married her female partner in a civil marriage ceremony in 2007. When a parent reported their marriage to Waldron, Principal Nell Stetser asked Winters to resign;  when she refused, the school did not renew her contract. Many parents expressed anger and concern over the school's decision. Stetser said that "many of us accept life choices that contradict current Church teachings, but to continue as a Catholic school, Waldron Mercy must comply with those teachings." She called for "an open and honest discussion about this and other divisive issues at the intersection of our society and our Church." Chaput said the school administrators had shown "character and common sense at a moment when both seem to be uncommon".

On October 4, 2018, at the Synod on Young People and Vocations, Chaput objected to the use of the terms "LGBT" or "LGBTQ" in church documents. He said:"There is no such thing as an ‘LGBTQ Catholic' or a 'transgender Catholic' or even a 'heterosexual Catholic,' as if our sexual appetites defined who we are; as if these designations described discrete communities of differing but equal integrity within the real ecclesial community, the body of Jesus Christ."

Sexual abuse 
Chaput has denounced what he sees as a lack of orthodoxy in the church.  He accused past Catholic leaders of "ignorance, cowardice and laziness in forming young people to carry the faith into the future." On March 27, 2019, in a speech to Ohio seminarians, he blamed sexual abuse in the Catholic Church on "a pattern of predatory homosexuality and a failure to weed that out from church life".

Immigration reform 
Chaput advocates reform of immigration laws to regularize the status of most undocumented immigrants as a moral imperative.

See also
 Catholic Church in the United States
 Historical list of the Catholic bishops of the United States

References

External links

 The Archdiocese of Philadelphia website
 How to Conduct Politics as Catholics: The Denver Memorandum, Espresso (August 13, 2008)
 Review of Render Unto Caesar, The Ludwig von Mises Institute (September 2, 2008)
 'More than able to hold her own,' girl gets boot from Catholic football league.  Chaput quoted.

 

1944 births
Roman Catholic archbishops of Philadelphia
Roman Catholic archbishops of Denver
Capuchins
American people of French-Canadian descent
Prairie Band Potawatomi Nation people
Religious figures of the indigenous peoples of North America
Catholic University of America alumni
University of San Francisco alumni
People from Rapid City, South Dakota
People from Concordia, Kansas
Roman Catholic bishops of Rapid City
20th-century Roman Catholic archbishops in the United States
Living people
American anti-same-sex-marriage activists
Capuchin bishops
Catholics from Colorado
Catholics from Kansas
21st-century Roman Catholic archbishops in the United States
Native American Roman Catholics
Native American people from Kansas